The William H. and Alice Bailey House is an historic building located in Des Moines, Iowa. It is a two-story, balloon frame, front gable dwelling. Its significance is attributed to its association with the Baileys.

History 
William Bailey was the city attorney for the cities of North Des Moines and Des Moines. He is associated with the Annexation Movement in Des Moines in the late-1880s, and he agitated for municipal reform that led to the adoption of the Des Moines Plan in 1907. He worked to improve public education in Iowa, and served as a member of the School Commission in 1907. 

Alice Bailey was a progressive social reformer who promoted reforms to public health, education, municipal beautification, care for the elderly, children, and young women in need. She helped to initiate the introduction of child labor legislation in the Iowa General Assembly, and she was responsible for establishing institutions that cared for the aged and infirm in Des Moines. The house was listed on the National Register of Historic Places in 1996.

References

Houses completed in 1889
Victorian architecture in Iowa
Houses in Des Moines, Iowa
National Register of Historic Places in Des Moines, Iowa
Houses on the National Register of Historic Places in Iowa